The Ndutu skull is the partial cranium of a hominin that has been assigned variously to late Homo erectus Homo rhodesiensis, and early Homo sapiens, from the Middle Pleistocene, found at Lake Ndutu in northern Tanzania.

Discovery 
Lake Ndutu is a seasonal soda lake in the Serengeti, adjacent to Lake Masek and the Main Gorge at Olduvai. During September and October 1973, Amini Aza Mturi and the Tanzanian Department of Antiquities conducted an excavation of the exposed flats of the western shoreline of Lake Ndutu.
Amini Aza Mturi’s excavation found 270 lithic and faunal materials in the first occupational floor of the excavation site, of which 20 were definitive tools. The tools were mainly spheroids and hammerstones, with six flakes (three regular flakes, two triangular, one rectangular).  Amini Aza Mturi noticed the absence of Acheulean tools during his excavation, despite the cranial features of the skull being associated with the Acheulean industry. However, hand axes were later discovered during later visits to the site.

According to Amini Aza Mturi, preliminary chronometric dating and racemization of bone found in the first occupational level has yielded a general age of 500,000 and 600,000 years. Other estimates based on the association of the Ndutu deposits with the Masek Beds at Olduvai suggest an age approaching 400,000 years.

Reconstruction and analysis 
The Ndutu cranium was badly damaged and fragmented when it was found. The pieces of the skull were repaired and reconstructed by R.J. Clarke who made the initial description of it. According to Clarke, the Ndutu skull seemed to form a link between Homo erectus and archaic Homo sapiens, due to it having certain features in common with both.

Parts of skull remaining 
The occipital was well preserved and almost completely intact. The temporals were damaged; the left temporal was more complete than the right temporal. The parietals were shattered; the majority of the right parietal was reconstructed, along with fragments of the left parietal. The frontal was mostly gone, a small piece of the right side above the brow ridge remained. The central region of the face includes much of the nasal aperture, part of the left nasal bone, part of the orbital rims with the lacrimal grooves, parts of the sphenoid, and much of the right orbital plate. Part of the right side of the face is preserved down to the infraorbital foramen, and on the left side there is a part that goes down to the palate, where the roots for the left canine, P3, P4, M1, and M2 are found.

Similarities to Homo erectus 
The occipital has a well-developed nuchal torus that gives the skull an angulated lateral contour similar to Homo erectus. The mastoid process is small, and its posterior part is flat and lies in the nuchal plane, particularly similar to Olduvai hominids 9 and 12. The frontal bone has an almost vertical forehead, similar to Homo erectus, but unlike the Ngangdong or the Broken Hill crania. The walls of the frontal, occipital, parietals, and temporals, were very thick.

Similarities to Homo sapiens 
The area of bone around the right parietal indicates parietal bossing. The sides of the braincase are more vertical when viewed from the back. The right tympanic plate has an ossified styloid process. There appears to be no sagittal torus. The supramastoid crest does not extend over the external acoustic meatus. G. Philip Rightmire stressed Ndutu's affinities to archaic H.sapiens and even proposed its allocation to a subspecies of H. sapiens.

Controversy 
After Clarke’s analysis of the Ndutu skull, it was generally classified as Homo erectus. G. Philip Rightmire disagreed with this classification, and believed that its features suggested that it was more similar to the African fossils referred to as archaic Homo sapiens. According to Rightmire, the length and breadth dimensions of the Ndutu cranium are similar to earlier Homo erectus fossils from Koobi Fora and Illeret, while its size is more similar to OH 12 than OH 9. Based on the occipital morphology, mastoid shape, glenoid cavity, and tympanic plate of the Ndutu hominid, Rightmire claims that the fossil hominids it most resembles are Broken Hill, Elandsfontein, and other archaic Homo sapiens found in Africa. Chris Stringer classifies the cranium as belonging to Homo heidelbergensis/Homo rhodesiensis (a species considered to be intermediate between Homo erectus and Homo sapiens) rather than as early H. sapiens, but considers it to display a "more sapiens-like zygomaxillary morphology" than certain other examples of Homo rhodesiensis. In later work, he details it as a sole sister to the Neanderthal and another group containing the Steinheim skull, plus a group related to Homo antecessor, and Homo longi and Homo Sapiens.

See also 
List of human evolution fossils

References 

Homo fossils
Archaeological discoveries in Tanzania
Archaeology of Tanzania
Fossils of Tanzania
1973 archaeological discoveries
Archaeology of Eastern Africa